A statue of Felipe de Neve (sometimes called Don Felipe de Neve or Governor Felipe de Neve) is installed in Los Angeles' El Pueblo de Los Ángeles Historical Monument, in the U.S. state of California.

References

External links 

 Felipe de Neve, 1728–84 at the Historical Marker Database
 Don Felipe de Neve -- Los Angeles CA at Waymarking

El Pueblo de Los Ángeles Historical Monument
Monuments and memorials in Los Angeles
Outdoor sculptures in Greater Los Angeles
Sculptures of men in California
Statues in Los Angeles